Vabbing is the application of vaginal secretions as a perfume.  It was popularized on TikTok in 2022 as a way of attracting men.

Use and popularization
Vabbing is done by placing vaginal secretions on pulse points behind the ear and the wrist, with the intention of attracting men. It was popularised on TikTok in 2022.

Efficacy and risk
There is no research that indicates this technique works with the placebo effect offered by a relevant expert as the only possibility for any efficacy. Experts caution that penetrating the vagina with a finger as recommended for vabbing may cause or spread infection.

References

2020s fads and trends
TikTok
Vagina
Perfumes